The Roma Power Station is a peaking power station in Roma, South West Queensland, Australia.  It has a maximum capacity of 80 megawatts. Operations began 3 June 1999.

Old power station
The connection of local natural gas suppliers to the old power station was Australia's first commercial gas project.  It began operations in 1961.

See also

List of active power stations in Queensland
List of natural gas power stations in Australia

References

Natural gas-fired power stations in Queensland
South West Queensland
Roma, Queensland
Buildings and structures in Queensland
1999 establishments in Australia